The Lincoln County Courthouse is located in Merrill, Wisconsin. It was listed on the National Register of Historic Places in 1978 and on the State Register of Historic Places in 1989.

References

Courthouses on the National Register of Historic Places in Wisconsin
National Register of Historic Places in Lincoln County, Wisconsin
Beaux-Arts architecture in Wisconsin
Government buildings completed in 1903